Miss Togo is the national beauty pageant of Togo.

History
Miss Togo held in 1995 and had sent to Miss International and Miss ECOWAS pageants. Togo has famous about Miss Universe and Miss World but the country is still not participating at the pageants.

Titleholders

Togo at International pageants

Miss International Togo

Miss Supranational Togo

External links
www.misstogo.tg

References

Beauty pageants in Togo
Recurring events established in 1995
Togolese beauty pageant winners
Togolese awards